Silver Spring Township is a township in Cumberland County, Pennsylvania, United States. The population was 13,657 at the 2010 census, up from 10,592 at the 2000 census.

Geography
The township is in northeastern Cumberland County and is bordered to the north by Perry County, the border following the ridgecrest of Blue Mountain. The southeastern corner of the township borders the borough of Mechanicsburg.

Conodoguinet Creek, a tributary of the Susquehanna River, crosses the center of the township from west to east, making several long bends. Interstate 81 also crosses the center of the township, with access from Exit 57, Pennsylvania Route 114. U.S. Route 11 crosses the township south of I-81, passing through the two main unincorporated communities in the township, Hogestown and New Kingstown. The Pennsylvania Turnpike (Interstate 76) crosses the southwest corner of the township but without any direct access.

Unincorporated communities in Silver Spring Township:
Dillsburg Junction
Hogestown
Locust Point
New Kingstown, a census-designated place
Roxbury
Wertzville

Demographics
As of the census of 2000, there were 10,592 people, 4,061 households, and 3,102 families residing in the township.  The population density was 325.8 people per square mile (125.8/km2).  There were 4,185 housing units at an average density of 128.7/sq mi (49.7/km2).  The racial makeup of the township was 96.15% White, 0.37% African American, 0.08% Native American, 2.30% Asian, 0.04% Pacific Islander, 0.30% from other races, and 0.76% from two or more races. Hispanic or Latino of any race were 0.73% of the population.

There were 4,061 households, out of which 34.1% had children under the age of 18 living with them, 67.6% were married couples living together, 6.1% had a female householder with no husband present, and 23.6% were non-families. 19.7% of all households were made up of individuals, and 8.2% had someone living alone who was 65 years of age or older.  The average household size was 2.60 and the average family size was 3.00.

In the township the population was spread out, with 25.6% under the age of 18, 5.1% from 18 to 24, 29.5% from 25 to 44, 27.4% from 45 to 64, and 12.4% who were 65 years of age or older.  The median age was 40 years. For every 100 females there were 96.2 males.  For every 100 females age 18 and over, there were 93.4 males.

The median income for a household in the township was $54,932, and the median income for a family was $63,828. Males had a median income of $45,152 versus $29,821 for females. The per capita income for the township was $31,728.  About 1.4% of families and 2.4% of the population were below the poverty line, including 1.8% of those under age 18 and 5.3% of those age 65 or over.

Retail
Many major retail shopping developments are located in Silver Spring township. Most are located along the highly traveled Carlisle Pike (U.S. Route 11) which serves as a major traffic route through the township connecting it to nearby Hampden Township, the most populous township in Cumberland County.
 Cumberland Marketplace
 Silver Spring Commons
 Silver Spring Square

Township agencies
Board of Supervisors
Zoning Hearing Board
Planning Commission
New Kingstown Vision Committee
Recreation Advisory Council
Emergency Management Council
Agricultural Security Council
Conservation and Preservation Committee
Veterans Memorial Committee
Board of Auditors
Board of Police Pension
Authority (Sewer)

Advisory boards, committees and councils
Agricultural Security Area Committee
Business Advisory Council
Conservation & Preservation Committee
Emergency Management Agency
Hogestown Heritage Committee
Land Preservation Review Board
New Kingstown Vision Committee
Planning Commission
Recreational Advisory Council
Sewer Authority Board
Veteran's Memorial Committee
Zoning Hearing Board

References

External links

Silver Spring Township official website

Townships in Cumberland County, Pennsylvania